The Flag of South Yemen consisted of a tricolour consisting of the three equal horizontal red, white, and black bands of the Arab Liberation flag with the sky-blue chevron and a red star on the left side of the hoist. 

The flag was adopted on 30 November 1967 when South Yemen declared independence from the United Kingdom until the Yemeni unification in 1990. It was used again for a few months in 1994 during the existence of the Democratic Republic of Yemen. Today, the South Yemeni flag is used by the separatist supporters from the Southern Movement and the Southern Transitional Council.

Gallery

See also
Flag of Yemen
Emblem of Yemen
Pan-Arabism
Pan-Arab colors

External links

Flags introduced in 1967
Flag
Flags of Asia
South Yemen
 South Yemen